Olrog's cinclodes (Cinclodes olrogi) is a species of bird in the family Furnariidae. It is endemic to Argentina. The species is named after Swedish-Argentine biologist Claes C. Olrog.

Its natural habitat is subtropical or tropical high-altitude shrubland.

It inhabits a narrow strip of land ranging from San Luis to north of Córdoba.

References

Olrog's cinclodes
Endemic birds of Argentina
Olrog's cinclodes
Taxonomy articles created by Polbot